Pemphigus erythematosus  is simply a localized form of pemphigus foliaceus with features of  lupus erythematosus.

See also 
 Pemphigus
 List of cutaneous conditions
 List of conditions caused by problems with junctional proteins

References

External links 

Chronic blistering cutaneous conditions
Syndromes